Joseph Loring (July 21, 1743 - 1815) was an American silversmith, active in Boston.

Loring was born in Hull, Massachusetts, the son of Caleb and Rebecca (Lobdell) Loring, and apprenticed about 1756 to Benjamin Burt or Paul Revere in Boston, where he worked from 1765 to 1813 as a silversmith and jeweler. He was listed in the 1789 and 1800 city directories at 3 Union Street, and from 1796-1813 identified as a goldsmith and jeweler at 14 Court Street. During the American Revolution, he served as First Lieutenant of the Artillery Company, probably in Crane's Continental Artillery Regiment, taken prisoner on Long Island and held nine months, and in July 1777 returned to Boston. In 1791 he was Second Sergeant in the Artillery Company. Loring was married three times: to Mary Atkins on August 21, 1766; to an unknown second wife; to Sally Pratt as his third wife.

Loring produced a variety of forms, including baptismal basins, beakers, canns, wine cups, creampots, and porringers, but few teapots. Some items also include marks of Jesse Churchill of Boston; Samuel Bartlett of Concord; or Ebenezer Moulton of Newburyport, Massachusetts. It is possible that these men supplied one another with silver to meet market demands. Loring's work is collected in the Museum of Fine Arts, Boston, Art Institute of Chicago, Metropolitan Museum of Art, and Winterthur Museum.

References 

 "Joseph Loring", American Silversmiths.
 History of the Military Company of the Massachusetts, now called the Ancient and Honorable Artillery Company of Massachusetts, Oliver Ayer Roberts, A. Mudge & son, printers, 1897, page 233.
 Historic Silver of the Colonies and Its Makers, Francis Hill Bigelow, Francis Hill Bigelow, Macmillan, 1917, page 200.
 American Church Silver of the Seventeenth and Eighteenth Centuries: With a Few Pieces of Domestic Plate, Exhibited at the Museum of Fine Arts, July to December, 1911, Museum of Fine Arts, 1911, page 85.
 Catalogue of an exhibition of American paintings, furniture, silver and other objects of art, MDCXXV-MDCCCXXV, Henry Watson Kent, Florence N. Levy, Metropolitan Museum of Art, 1909, page 114.
 History of the Town of Hingham, Massachusetts, Volume III: Genealogical, Hingham (Mass.) town, 1893, page 31.

American silversmiths
1743 births
1815 deaths